Robert Scott (1822 – 2 February 1904)
was a Manchester businessman who was one of the founders of the Tootal Broadhurst Lee cotton company.

Scott was a notable early example of a successful manager in the textile industry, achieving significant wealth within the largest company of the time whilst being neither self-made nor from a textile family.

Born the son of a farmer at Abbey Holm in Cumbria, he was a salesman by the time of his 1845 marriage to Maria in Cheetham Hill, north Manchester.

He became a business partner of Henry Tootal Broadhurst, Henry Lee and Joseph Lee who together subsequently formed the company Tootal Broadhurst Lee, a vertically integrated firm that was unusual for its time in combining weaving and spinning

and was to become by the 1880s the largest cotton manufacturer in Lancashire.
Henry Tootal Broadhurst's son, Edward Tootal Broadhurst would go on to become company chairman. 
Scott became 'cashier', or finance director, of Tootal Broadhurst Lee in 1854

and was deputy chairman of the Equitable Fire and Accident Office insurance company; by the 1881 census he was described a spinning manufacturer.

In 1874 Scott bought ten acres of land in Bowdon, south Manchester, from the Earl of Stamford at a cost of £7075
and
built a large villa, Denzell, 
to the designs of the architects Clegg and Knowles.
The house cost £18,000 to build and a reported £30,000 in all.

Scott was recorded in the 1881 census as living at Denzell with his wife and a staff of nine. 
The building is now known as Denzell Hall and is Grade II* listed as a notable example of a specifically commissioned late nineteenth century house for a wealthy patron with a high degree of craftsmanship and quality of materials.
The listing cites the design as inventive and eclectic and by a noted Manchester architects' practice;

the architectural critic Pevsner described it as a luscious but 'very bad' mixture of debased Jacobean, Gothic and Italianate.

Scott's son Henry predeceased him and at his death in 1904 the house was sold to the Lamb family.

References

1822 births
1904 deaths
Businesspeople from Manchester
Clothing manufacturers
19th-century English businesspeople